Kashefa Hussain (born 1 July 1958) is a Bangladeshi justice of the High Court Division.

Early life and education 
Hussain was born on 1 July 1958. Her father, Syed Muhammad Hussain was also a justice. Her mother's name is Suraiya Hussain. She passed her B.A and M.A in English literature from University of Dhaka. She has completed her second masters in law from University of London.

Career 
Hussain was elevated as additional judge of the High Court Division on 5 August 2013.

References

External links 
 Judges' List: High Court Division - Name and Short Biography

Living people
1958 births
University of Dhaka alumni
Alumni of the University of London
Bangladeshi women judges